Paquirea is a monotypic genus of flowering plants belonging to the family Asteraceae. The only species is Paquirea lanceolata.

Its native range is Peru.

References

Mutisioideae
Monotypic Asteraceae genera